The men's 4 × 100 metres relay event at the 2003 Pan American Games was held on August 8–9. The original winners, the United States, were later disqualified after one of their members, Mickey Grimes, was found guilty of ephedrine doping.

Medalists

*Athletes who competed in heats only.

Results

Heats
Qualification: First 3 teams of each heat (Q) plus the next 2 fastest (q) qualified for the final.

Final

References
Results

Athletics at the 2003 Pan American Games
2003